Western Park is the name of various areas worldwide:

 Western Park, Beijing, a former imperial park now divided into the public Beihai Park and government Zhongnanhai compound
 Western Park, Auckland, a park in Auckland, New Zealand
 Western Park, Leicester, a park in the English city of Leicester
 Western Park Warragul, a recreation reserve in the West Gippsland town of Warragul, Victoria, Australia
 Sun Yat Sen Memorial Park, formerly called Western Park, a park in Sai Ying Pun, Victoria City, Hong Kong  
 Western Park, Oak Cliff, a small neighborhood in the Oak Cliff area of Dallas, Texas, United States

See also
West Park (disambiguation)
Weston Park (disambiguation)